Orangetheory Stadium is a rugby football stadium in Christchurch, New Zealand. It was formerly called AMI Stadium, and before that, the Addington Showgrounds.

History
The park is part of a complex with Christchurch Arena and Addington Raceway and has hosted international rugby league matches since the 1950s, including World Cup matches in 1975, 1977, 1988, 1990 and 1991.

The ground was bought by Canterbury Rugby League from the Christchurch City Council in the 1990s.

It was at this ground that the Kiwis won the 1988 Great Britain Lions tour's sole test in New Zealand to qualify for the 1985–1988 Rugby League World Cup final.

Orangetheory Stadium
Rugby League Park sustained significant damage during the February 2011 Christchurch earthquake and was closed until 24 March 2012. After the earthquake the stands had to be demolished.

The 2011 earthquake damaged AMI Stadium at Lancaster Park, the main sporting ground in Christchurch, beyond repair. As a temporary replacement for the city, Rugby League Park was upgraded and renamed AMI Stadium to seat 18,000 by March 2012 with a possible expansion to 26,000 for major games. As a result, the Crusaders are based there indefinitely, and the stadium has also hosted All Blacks test matches as well as a Wellington Phoenix pre-season match in September 2012.
On 9 November 2013 it held a round 5 A-League match between Wellington Phoenix and Perth Glory in which the teams drew 1-1. On 14 May 2016, the ground played host to an NRL match between the Penrith Panthers and the New Zealand Warriors with the former being the home team. Another NRL game took place on 9 June 2018 with the Manly-Warringah Sea Eagles replacing Penrith as the home team against the Warriors. The Sea Eagles played another game at the stadium in 2019 but decided to not play in Christchurch in the 2020 season.

On 6 July 2018, the stadium was officially renamed to the Wyatt Crockett Stadium, becoming de-branded from AMI Stadium. This was to commemorate the Crusaders player Wyatt Crockett reaching the milestone of playing 200 Super Rugby matches.

On 6 April 2019, it was announced that the stadium would soon be known as Orangetheory Stadium. The new name went into effect in June 2019.

International rugby league matches
A list of rugby league test matches played at the Addington Showgrounds / Rugby League Park.

References

External links

Orangetheory Stadium page at Vbase
Christchurch Stadium broken med.govt.nz
Rugby League Park rleague.com
Rugby League Park rugbyleagueproject.org

Sports venues in Christchurch
Rugby league stadiums in New Zealand
Rugby League World Cup stadiums
Rugby union stadiums in New Zealand
Association football venues in New Zealand
2011 Christchurch earthquake